Brooks Camp is a visitor attraction and archeological site in Katmai National Park and Preserve, noted for its opportunities for visitors to observe Alaskan brown bears catching fish in the falls of the Brooks River during salmon spawning season. This natural choke point for salmon runs made it an attractive location for prehistoric Alaskans, who occupied the area from 4500 BP. The Aglegmuit people lived along the Brooks River in historical times. The Brooks River Archeological District, which includes Brooks Camp, was designated a National Historic Landmark in 1993.

The original name for the lake was Ketivik, or Qit'rwik, which means "beavers broke their houses a long time ago," or alternatively, "sheltered place behind a point."  Brooks Lake and Brooks River were named in 1919 by Robert Fiske Griggs, after Alfred Hulse Brooks, the geologist in charge of exploring and mapping the Territory of Alaska.

Five thousand years before present the level of Naknek Lake was significantly higher, and Lake Brooks was part of Naknek. As the Naknek River cut through glacial moraines, the level of Naknek Lake fell, creating Lake Brooks and the Brooks River. Permanent habitation was established along the river about 4000 years ago. The area was inhabited when the first Russian explorers reached what is now Brooks Camp in the 18th century. The National Park Service operates a seasonal visitor center at Brooks Camp, with an exhibit of a reconstructed native house built in 1967-68 in the footprint of a documented house site. Visitors arrive at the Lake Brooks Seaplane Base via floatplane.  Lodge guests can take a bus tour to the Valley of Ten Thousand Smokes.

The camp was developed in 1950 by Northern Consolidated Airlines, a National Park Service concessionaire who operated a chain of camps in Katmai, served by float planes. Brooks Lodge continues to operate as a concession within the park. Bear viewing season peaks in July, when the salmon are migrating, and in September, when the salmon are dying after spawning and are washing downstream. Peak visitor season is in July.

With encouragement from General Twining, Ray Petersen representing NCA, approached the National Park Service and the Bureau of Land Management in Dec. 1949 to establish four fishing camps, Brooks and Grosvenor on NPS land and Kulik and Battle on BLM land.  NCA would provide access to inaccessible areas of the park system, while the NPS saw a way to provide increased visitation under park protection.  A five year concession permit was issued in 1950.  Ray Petersen explained how he chose the location of his Angler's Paradise Lodges (Brooks, Kulik, Battle and Grosvenor), "We put the camps on the best rivers for rainbow trout.  We looked for salmon spawning water that would draw the rainbows."  Bo Bennett goes on to explain, "At nearly every place with two lakes and a short salmon-spawning river connecting them, Ray put in a camp."  Hence, Brooks Lodge is on the Brooks River connecting Lake Brooks and Naknek Lake.  Likewise, Grosvenor Lodge lies between Lake Coville and Lake Grosvenor, Kulik Lodge lies between Nonvianuk Lake and Kulik Lake, while Battle River Lodge lies between Battle Lake and Narrow Cove on Kukaklek Lake.  In 1976, a policy of catch and release was implemented in all Angler's Paradise Camps.

The Brooks Camp of 1950 could manage 30 guests who slept in 9 tent cabins, which included wooden floors, windows, doors, screen doors, cots and sleeping bags.  Besides providing running water, shower baths, and a large root cellar, the camp provided meals cooked in a 32 by 16 foot kitchen.  Brooks Camp had 138 guests in 1950 and 1,082 in 1959.

The NCA erected a red cedar Pan Adobe lodge, 7 cabins, and bath house in 1960.  The first bear viewing platform at the falls and a temporary foot bridge across the mouth of Brooks River were constructed in 1981-1982.  A 15 year concessionaire agreement was signed between Katmailand, Inc, and the NPS in 1981.  Brooks Lodge and dining room were expanded in 1984, and the last of the original camp tent frames were removed in 1985 and 1986.  A 40-person Falls Platform was built in 1997.  The raised platform to the falls was built in 2000.

See also
Brooks River Historic Ranger Station
Brooks River Archeological District

References

External links
 visiting Brooks Camp, National Park Service
 Brooks Camp history, National Park Service
 Brooks Camp Bearcams (six cameras), National Park Service
 Bear viewing at Brooks Camp, NPS brochure
 NPS plans to build an elevated bridge over Brooks River

Buildings and structures in Lake and Peninsula Borough, Alaska
Katmai National Park and Preserve
Tourist attractions in Lake and Peninsula Borough, Alaska
1950 establishments in Alaska